Standard Schaefer (born 1971) is an American poet.

Life
Standard grew up in Houston, Texas. He graduated from the Kinkaid School of Houston in 1990, and after high school he attended Occidental College, graduating with a Bachelor of Arts in 1994, and continued his studies at the University of California obtaining a master's in Professional Writing in 1998. 

He is an independent journalist, a free-lance writer, and a contributor to CounterPunch.  His first book, Nova, was selected for the National Poetry Series in 1999 and published by Sun and Moon Books. His second book, Water & Power, was published by Agincourt Books. His poetry and criticism have appeared in several U.S. anthologies, and two international ones. 

He taught at Otis College and after living in San Francisco, California, Standard and his wife moved to Portland, Oregon. 

His work appears in Boston Review, The New Review of Literature, The Washington Review, Aufgabe, Interim, Fence, Rain Taxi, New American Writing, Fence, Non, Ribot, X-Connect, Epoch, and Rosebud. He co-edited the literary journals Rhizome with Evan Calbi and Ribot with Paul Vangelisti. He is the non-fiction editor of The New Review of Literature. 

He and his wife live in Portland, Oregon, where he is working on a master's degree in Media Studies.

Awards
 1999 National Poetry Series, for Nova

Works
 "Regression to Mean: An Elegy for New Orleans", Slope #22, Fall/Winter 2005
 "GALVESTON"; "RED HEADED STRANGER"; "AUGUST 21, 1971"; "PINE"; "OCCIDENTAL", Fence, Volume 2
 "REAGAN IS DEAD"; "MY STINT IN THE ACLU", Octopus Magazine
 "from nova suite, iv, part 6", Cross Connect
 "The Birds Sing to Plato"; "Socrates (A Hasty Reply)"; "Upon Entering"; "Aristotle in the Thinkery"; "The Boy in the Back of the Room or The Young Paremenides"; "At the Registrar"; "The Birds Sing to the Boy"; "The Boy at the Back of the Room Sings to the Birds"; "Aristophanes to Aristotle: Concerning First Books Or How I Think We Met "; "Aristophanes"; "A Few Words from Parmenides", Gut Cult, Issue 6

Criticism
"Ropes of Light", Jacket 32, April 2007

Edited

References

External links
"Standard Schaefer", Here Comes Everybody, April 30, 2005 
"Interview with Standard Schaefer", Fascicile

1971 births
Living people
American male poets
21st-century American poets
Writers from Houston
Poets from Texas
Occidental College alumni
University of California alumni
Otis College of Art and Design faculty
21st-century American male writers